Fred LeBlanc is the lead singer/drummer for the New Orleans-based rock band Cowboy Mouth, and a freelance songwriter, record producer, short story author, and acoustic performer. Known for his "maniacal" performance style, and described as "a short, muscular guy with a heavy brow and piercingly intelligent eyes", LeBlanc has been called "one of the more instantly recognizable figures in contemporary Louisiana music."

Biography
After graduating from Jesuit High School in New Orleans, LeBlanc began his career in the early 1980s as the drummer of the Backbeats, also from New Orleans, which featured many future members of Cowboy Mouth.

A year after the Backbeats disbanded in the mid-1980s, LeBlanc joined power trio Dash Rip Rock as drummer and as contributing songwriter and co-lead singer. The band was heavily influenced by the American roots music movement of the time, as well as the frenzied punk and rock stylings of both the Sex Pistols and Jerry Lee Lewis. To this mix, LeBlanc's songs usually had a very strong melodic component, with "Operator", "Blue Moon At Midnight", and "Go Home, Little Girl."

LeBlanc left Dash Rip Rock in mid-1989 and signed a deal as a solo artist with EMI Records. Although no recordings were ever released from his tenure with the label, LeBlanc has said that the year off from the road "gave me a chance to focus on my songwriting," with LeBlanc writing many songs during that time that would appear on various Cowboy Mouth recordings later on.

LeBlanc formed Cowboy Mouth in late 1990 with a lineup that has changed variously throughout the years, with the main constants being LeBlanc and John Thomas Griffith on guitar and vocals. The band has maintained a steady touring schedule since their formation, gaining notoriety for their live shows. LeBlanc has written many of Cowboy Mouth's material, such as "How Do You Tell Someone", "Love Of My Life", "Disconnected", "Take Me Back To New Orleans", "Easy", "Tell The Girl", "So Sad About Me", "The Avenue", and the band's signature song "Jenny Says".

In addition to performing and recording with Cowboy Mouth, LeBlanc has worked as a producer. He produced A Different Story by Deadeye Dick. The album featured the song "New Age Girl", which earned the band and LeBlanc a gold record in the early 1990s and was included in the Jim Carrey movie Dumb And Dumber.

LeBlanc has produced material for Mark Bryan of Hootie & The Blowfish, and albums for Dash Rip Rock, The Bingemen, and The Garden District. He also released solo albums entitled Here On Earth, Shiver, Double Dammit, and Playing The Game Of My Life, as well as an album of spoken word short stories (also released as a book) called Always Give Thanks. In July 2010, LeBlanc said that he would continue to release solo music during breaks in Cowboy Mouth's schedule.

Discography

Cowboy Mouth studio albums 
 Word of Mouth • 1992
 It Means Escape • 1994
 Are You with Me? • 1996
 Word of Mouth (Remix) • 1996
 Mercyland • 1998
 Easy • 2000
 Uh-Oh • 2003
 Voodoo Shoppe • 2006
 Fearless • 2008
 This Train... • 2012
 Go! • 2014

Cowboy Mouth live albums and EPs 
 Mouthin' Off (Live & More) • 1993
 Mouthin' Off (Live & More) (Remastered) • 1997
 Cowboy Mouth LIVE! (limited edition 5-song EP issued with Mercyland) • 1998
 Live in the X Lounge "Jenny Says" • 1998 & 2001
 All You Need Is Live • 2000
 Live in the X Lounge "Easy" • 2000
 Uh Oh (5-song Preview EP) • 2003
 Live at the Zoo • 2004
 Mardi Gras • 2010
 This Train • 2013
 Go • 2014
Open Wide • 2020

Cowboy Mouth live DVD 
 The Name of the Band is Cowboy Mouth  • 2007

Dash Rip Rock albums featuring work of Fred LeBlanc 
 Paydirt (1998) (producer only)
 Ace of Clubs (1989) 
 Dash Rip Rock (1987)

References

External links
Cowboy Mouth website
Fred LeBlanc website

Cowboy Mouth members
Year of birth missing (living people)
Living people
American male singer-songwriters
American rock songwriters
American rock singers
Jesuit High School (New Orleans) alumni
American alternative rock musicians
Musicians from New Orleans
Cowpunk musicians
Alternative rock singers
Alternative rock drummers
American rock drummers
Singer-songwriters from Louisiana